| lowest attendance = 473 Ealing Trailfinders at home to Nottingham on 12 April 2014
| tries = {{#expr:
 + 6 + 6 + 4 + 3 + 7 + 4
 + 6 + 8 + 3 +10 + 6 + 6
 + 4 + 6 + 7 + 6 + 3 + 7
 + 5 + 5 + 9 + 6 +11 + 2
 + 4 + 5 + 6 + 5 + 7 + 7
 + 3 + 2 + 4 +10 + 6 + 4
 + 3 + 2 + 4 + 4 + 2 + 2
 + 4 + 4 + 6 + 4 + 6 + 1
 + 4 + 2 + 4 + 5 + 6 + 4
+ 6 + 6 + 6 + 7 + 8 + 6
+ 2 + 4 + 1 + 4 + 1 + 7
+ 6 + 3 + 5 + 7 + 1 + 7
+ 1 + 8 + 4 + 6 + 2
+ 0 + 1 + 7 + 5 +10 + 6
+12 + 9 + 8 + 3 + 8
+ 0 +11 + 6
 + 4
+ 9
+ 1 + 5 + 4 + 6 + 5 + 5
+ 5 + 3 + 7 + 8 +11 + 9
  + 8
  + 6
   + 4
+ 5 + 6 + 8 + 6 + 4 + 8
+ 6 + 5 + 3 + 4 +16 + 6
+ 7 + 8 + 8 + 5 + 8 + 8
+ 7 + 8 + 5 +14 + 7 + 6
+ 6 + 8 + 9 +13 +12 + 2
+ 4 + 5 + 2 + 5 + 4 + 5
}}
| top point scorer =  Juan Pablo Socino(Rotherham) 300 points
| top try scorer =  Miles Mantella(London Scottish) 19 tries
| prevseason = 2012–13
| nextseason = 2014–15
}}
The 2013–14 RFU Championship, known for sponsorship reasons as the Greene King IPA Championship, was the fifth season of the professionalised format of the RFU Championship, the second tier of the English rugby union league system run by the Rugby Football Union. It was held between 14 September 2013 and 4 June 2014. It was contested by eleven English clubs and one from Jersey in the Channel Islands. It was also the first Championship season with a title sponsor, as the Rugby Football Union and Greene King Brewery reached a deal by which the brewery would become the competition's main sponsor from 2013–14 through to 2016–17.

After being promoted after an appeal in the previous season, London Welsh were relegated back into the RFU Championship after finishing last in the 2012-13 English Premiership. As a result of relegation, they remained at the Kassam Stadium in Oxford instead of returning to their home ground of Old Deer Park in London in order to strengthen their support base. London Welsh replaced Newcastle Falcons who were promoted into the English Premiership after winning the play-off final against Bedford Blues. Doncaster Knights were relegated to the 2013–14 National League 1 and were replaced by the champions of National League 1, Ealing Trailfinders who played in the RFU Championship for the first time.

The twelve clubs in the 2013–14 RFU Championship also participated in the 2013–14 edition of the British and Irish Cup along with clubs from Wales, Scotland and Ireland. Matches in the RFU Championship were broadcast on Sky Sports.

Structure 

The Championship's structure had all the teams playing each other on a home and away basis. In a change to previous years, this season commenced with an extra round of games in the "Greene King IPA Big Rugby Weekend".  Matches were played on the weekend of 14 and 15 September with three double headers at neutral grounds: Saracens' Allianz Park, Doncaster's Castle Park and Exeter's Sandy Park.

The play–off structure remained the same as the previous year. The top four teams at the end of the home–and–away season qualified for the promotion play–offs, which followed a 1 v 4, 2 v 3 system. The winners had to meet the RFU's Minimum Standards Criteria in order to be promoted to the Premiership. If they had failed to meet the criteria, then there would have been no promotion from the RFU Championship. However, on 9 May 2014, the RFU announced that all four play-off participants had met the Minimum Standards Criteria, assuring that the champion would indeed be promoted to the 2014–15 Premiership. There was no relegation play–off; the bottom team was automatically relegated. Following an agreement with the RFU in 2012, each RFU Championship club received £355,000 in funding from the RFU for the season.

Participating teams 

Notes

League table

Regular season 
The 2013–14 RFU Championship kicked off on the weekend of 14 and 15 September with the "Greene King IPA Big Rugby Weekend", an extra round of matches played as three double headers at neutral grounds.  Thereafter, each team played the other twice on a home and away basis with the top four qualifying for the promotion phase.

Round 1 (Big Rugby Weekend)

Round 2

Round 3

Round 4

Round 5

Round 6

Round 7

Round 8

Round 9

Round 10

Round 11

Round 12

Round 13 

 This match was postponed due to a waterlogged pitch.  It was rescheduled to 23 February.

Round 14

Round 15 

 This match was postponed, as the surface of many parts of the pitch is under water.  It has been rescheduled to 21 February.

Round 16 

 This match was postponed as the pitch was deemed unplayable. It has been rescheduled to 22 February.

 This match was postponed due to a waterlogged pitch.

 This match was postponed after a pitch inspection at The Mennaye.  It has been rescheduled to 16 March.

Postponed matches 

 This match – originally scheduled to be played in Round 15 on 7 February 2014 – was postponed as many parts of the pitch was under water.

 This match – originally scheduled to be played in Round 16 on 14 February 2014 – was postponed as the pitch was deemed unplayable.  The match was again postponed due to an unplayable pitch.  It will now be played on 15 March.

 This match – originally scheduled to be played in Round 13 on 26 January 2014 – was postponed due to a waterlogged pitch.

Round 17

Round 18

Postponed matches (2) 

 This match – originally scheduled to be played in Round 16 on 14 February 2014 – was postponed as the pitch was deemed unplayable.  The pitch was again found to be unplayable on the new date of 22 February, and the match was postponed for the second time.

 This match – originally scheduled to be played in Round 16 on 15 February 2014 – was postponed due to a waterlogged pitch.

 This match – originally scheduled to be played in Round 16 on 16 February 2014 – was postponed after a pitch inspection at The Mennaye.

Round 19

Round 20 

 This result means that London Welsh will finish in the top four and therefore are into the playoffs.
 

 This result means that Bristol will finish in the top four and therefore are into the playoffs.

Round 21

Round 22

Round 23

Play–offs

Semi–finals
The semi–finals followed a 1 v 4, 2 v 3 system - with the games being played over two legs and the higher placed team deciding who played at home in the first leg.

First leg

Second leg

 Bristol won 39 — 25 on aggregate

 London Welsh won 60 — 58 on aggregate

Final

 London Welsh won 48–28 on aggregate and were promoted to Premiership Rugby

Total attendances 

Note attendance statistics include 1st round with each team playing at the neutral venue considered the 'home team' as well as playoff games

Top scorers

Top points scorers

Top try scorers

Season records

Team
Largest home win — 70 pts
79 – 9 Rotherham Titans at home to Ealing Trailfinders on 21 September 2013
Largest away win — 44 pts
51 - 7 Rotherham Titans away to Nottingham on 9 March 2014
Most points scored — 82 pts
82 – 28 Bristol at home to Ealing Trailfinders on 30 March 2014
Most tries in a match — 12
Bristol at home to Ealing Trailfinders on 30 March 2014
Most conversions in a match — 11
Bristol at home to Ealing Trailfinders on 30 March 2014
Most penalties in a match — 8
Leeds Carnegie at home to London Welsh on 11 May 2014
Most drop goals in a match — 2
Ealing Trailfinders at home to Nottingham on 12 April 2014

Player
Most points in a match — 34
 Juan Pablo Socino for Rotherham Titans at home to Ealing Trailfinders on 21 September 2013
Most tries in a match — 4 (x2)
 Marko Mama for Bristol at home to Cornish Pirates on 9 March 2014
 Curtis Wilson for Rotherham Titans away to Nottingham on 9 March 2014
Most conversions in a match — 11
 Adrian Jarvis for Bristol at home to Ealing Trailfinders on 30 March 2014
Most penalties in a match —  7 
 Glyn Hughes for Leeds Carnegie at home to London Welsh on 11 May 2014
Most drop goals in a match —  1
N/A - multiple players

Attendances
Highest — 10,905
Bristol at home to London Welsh on 4 June 2014
Lowest — 473
Ealing Trailfinders at home to Nottingham on 12 April 2014
Highest Average Attendance — 5,662
Bristol
Lowest Average Attendance — 840
Ealing Trailfinders

See also
 2013–14 British and Irish Cup

References

External links 
 RFU Championship news

 
2013–14 in English rugby union leagues
2013-14